A store-within-a-store, also referred to as shop-in-shop, is an agreement in which a retailer rents a part of the retail space to be used by a different company to run another, independent shop.

Origins

In the early days of cellular telephone growth, wireless companies were concerned about showing investors a return and profits sufficient to cover the infrastructure costs. Cell phone towers situated in urban areas are typically not attractive and NIMBY neighbors made those costs higher. The carriers needed wide retail exposure and employed a distribution methodology that included making "agents" out of car stereo and alarm stores, car washes and other retailers since early cell phones were not mobile and needed to be installed in a vehicle. The advent of portable cell phones in the marketplace in the early 1990s meant more retailers could participate, since installations were not necessary for portable cell phones.

Phones were distributed through cell phone wholesalers to these retail agents. Eventually, wireless carriers also began limited distribution of portable cellular phones to their "agents" and retailers. The original membership "big-box" warehouse club, Price Club, located in San Diego, wanted to participate in the cellular phone sales for Price Club members. They contacted a cellular wholesaler, Beau Bennett, a San Diego resident and cellular wholesaler and asked to meet with him to discuss their options. In that subsequent meeting, Mr. Bennett showed Price Club buyers a range of portable cell phones and proceeded to layout a method to retail the phones with cell phone displays in Price Club warehouse stores. When the topic of profits arose, Mr. Bennett explained there were two channels of income related to cell phone service and equipment sales. There were adequate and typical profits on equipment and there was also an option for the retailer to participate in the carriers airtime profit. Airtime contracts could pay certain 'agents' as much as $350 and 7% of the customers monthly service bill for your customers, who signed airtime contracts for 2–3 years of cellular service.

Price Club buyers explained that those profits were "excessive" according to the corporate enshrined profit limits established by Price Club founders. This profit rejection was an issue that needed to be addressed and Price Club buyers asked Mr. Bennett to try and find a way for them to participate. After considering several options, Mr. Bennett eventually choose to form a third-party company, called Cellular Order Desk, to provide trained employees located at a kiosk just inside the entrance of the first Price Club location on Morena Boulevard. in San Diego. The arrangement Mr. Bennett offered included a smaller profit than originally intended, but within Price Club profit limits, for each cell phone sold.

Price Club buyers agreed to a one store trial which proved successful and popular with members. Eventually this first store-within-a-store program expanded to 3 additional locations, then to seven locations and eventually to all Price Club stores in Southern California. Price Club and Costco merged in 1993 and the first widely known store-within-a-store concept was expanded to include those additional warehouse locations in Southern California. Trained Cellular Order Desk employees staffed all stores and provided one-stop shopping for members. A customer could enter a Price Club/Costco warehouse location, choose a cell phone model and have it activated and available for pick-up at the will call window on the way out of the store. In those days, every cell phone had a programmable Number Assignment Module (NAM) which required pairing the phone's Electronic Serial Number (ESN) to the carrier's service. Some early phones were programmed with an electronic NAM writer device, but the handsets sold at Price Club/Costco locations were primarily programmed with the cell phone keypad.

This agreement is currently popular among filling stations and supermarkets. Many bookshops partner with coffee shops because customers often desire a place to sit and enjoy a drink while they browse. Companies that have employed this technique include BP/Amoco, Sheetz, ExxonMobil and Hollywood Video with its Game Crazy video-game boutiques.

Often the store-within-a-store is an owned by a manufacturer, operating an outlet within a retail company's store. For example, the American department store Bloomingdale's has had such arrangements with Ralph Lauren, Calvin Klein, DKNY and Kenneth Cole. Neiman Marcus, another American department store, has had them with Armani and Gucci.

A study by business school academics found that the arrangement works, because the retailer offers prime locations for which it can charge high rents, the manufacturer makes a higher profit than it would through a wholesale model, and the consumer gets a lower price and better service. The operator of the store-within-a-store can provide these benefits because it receives all profits, instead of having to share them with the retailer, as it would in the traditional split between manufacturer and retailer activities. The study also found that the arrangement works best for relatively non-substitutable goods, like cosmetics and brand fashions.

References 

Business models
Retail formats